Wen Xiaoming (born April 8, 1979) is a Chinese former footballer who predominantly played for Guangzhou Pharmaceutical. After eight years at the club he retired at the end of season 2008 because of a knee injury.

Club career
Wen Xiaoming started his career with top tier club Guangzhou Songri, however unfortunately in his debut season he was part of the team that saw the club relegated at the end of the 1999 Chinese league campaign. While he remained with the team he was unable to aid them win promotion and the club dissolved at the end of the season due to financial reasons. Wen would then move to local rivals Guangzhou Pharmaceutical where he went on to establish himself as regular within the team and was part of the squad that won the 2007 division title and promotion into the top tier. His return to the top tier, however did not last very long and he sustained a knee injury during the 2008 league campaign which forced him to retire at the end of the season.

Honours
Guangzhou Pharmaceutical
China League One: 2007

References

External links
Profile at Sohu Sports

1979 births
Living people
Chinese footballers
Footballers from Guangzhou
Guangzhou F.C. players
China League One players

Association football forwards